Joseph Daniel Mansueto (born September 3, 1956) is an American billionaire entrepreneur; the founder, majority owner and executive chairman of Morningstar, Inc. he is also the owner of Major League Soccer club Chicago Fire FC and of the Super League of Switzerland club FC Lugano

Early life and education
Joe Mansueto was born in Munster, Indiana, the son of Mario Mansueto, an Italian doctor. He attended Munster High School and graduated with a bachelor's and master's degrees in Business Administration from the University of Chicago.

Career
In 1984 Mansueto founded Morningstar out of his home with $80,000.  Morningstar went public in May 2005.

Through his company Mansueto Ventures, Mansueto purchased the financial magazines Inc. and Fast Company in June 2005. He was a limited partner in the publication of the entertainment magazine Time Out Chicago from 2005 to 2013.

As of June 2008, Mansueto owned about 60.4% of Morningstar common stock. In 2011, his majority ownership of Morningstar gained him inclusion on the Forbes World's Billionaires list, with a net worth at time of publication of $1.6 billion.

In September 2016, Morningstar announced that it had appointed Kunal Kapoor as chief executive officer, effective January 2017, with Mansueto becoming executive chairman at the same time.

In July 2018, it was announced that Mansueto had purchased a 49 percent stake in the Chicago Fire, a Major League Soccer team based in Bridgeview, Illinois. On September 13, 2019, it was announced that Mansueto had acquired full control of the Fire from Andrew Hauptman ahead of the club's move to Soldier Field.

In August 2021, it was announced that Mansueto had purchased FC Lugano, a soccer team competing in the Swiss Super League, and that they would work with Chicago Fire, interchanging players when needed.

Philanthropy
In May, 2008 it was announced that Mansueto and his wife Rika pledged $25 million to the expansion of the Joseph Regenstein Library at the University of Chicago.  The new wing, called the Joe and Rika Mansueto Library and designed by Chicago-based architect Helmut Jahn, was completed on May 16, 2011.

As of December 2010, Mansueto was the only Chicagoan on the list of American billionaires pledging to give away half of their wealth, as part of The Giving Pledge by Warren Buffett.

In the spring of 2016, Mansueto and his wife Rika announced a donation of $35 million to found the Mansueto Institute for Urban Innovation, a part of the University of Chicago committed to advancing urban science through interdisciplinary scholarship.

Personal life
In 1998, Mansueto married Japanese-American Rika Yoshida, a Morningstar analyst. They have three children and live in a home in Lincoln Park, Chicago that cost an estimated $22 million to build. Mansueto keeps strict work hours, 8:30 a.m. to 5 or 6 p.m., with an occasional Saturday at the office.

Mansueto's younger brother John died in 2003 of West Nile virus.

References

1956 births
American billionaires
Giving Pledgers
21st-century philanthropists
Living people
University of Chicago alumni 
University of Chicago Booth School of Business alumni
People from Munster, Indiana
American company founders
Chicago Fire FC non-playing staff